Elmina is a town and the capital of the Komenda/Edina/Eguafo/Abirem District in the Central Region of Ghana.

Elmina may also refer to:

In people
 Elmina Moisan (1897-1938), Chilean painter 
 Elmina M. Roys Gavitt (1828–1898), American physician; medical journal founder, editor-in-chief 
 Elmina Shepard Taylor (1830–1904), American women's rights activist

In places
 El Mina, Lebanon
 Elmina, Malaysia
 El Mina, Mauritania

In other
 Elmina Castle, in Elmina, Ghana
 Elmina Estate, an oil palm plantation in Malaysia
 Battle of Elmina (disambiguation)
 Elmina (film), a 2010 Ghanaian movie